The 2021 Tro-Bro Léon was the 37th edition of Tro-Bro Léon, a one-day road cycling race in the northwestern French region of Brittany, that took place on 16 May 2021. The 1.Pro-category race was initially scheduled to be a part of the inaugural edition of the UCI ProSeries, but after the 2020 edition was cancelled due to the COVID-19 pandemic, it made its UCI ProSeries debut in 2021, while also still being a part of the 2021 UCI Europe Tour. It was also the fourth event of the 2021 French Road Cycling Cup.

This year's edition was the first since its move to the new mid-May time slot from its usual late April time slot. The race started and finished in Lannilis, and covered  of the rolling and windy roads of Brittany. Interspersed along the route were 26 ribinoù sections totalling .

Teams 
Six of the nineteen UCI WorldTeams, eleven UCI ProTeams, and four UCI Continental teams made up the twenty-one teams that participated in the race. With two late scratches, 136 riders started the race, of which 86 finished.

UCI WorldTeams

 
 
 
 
 
 

UCI ProTeams

 
 
 
 
 
 
 
 
 
 
 

UCI Continental Teams

Result

References

Sources

External links 
 

Tro-Bro Léon
Tro-Bro Léon
Tro-Bro Léon
2021
Tro-Bro Léon